Strathmore was an American automobile company started in 1899. They made gas and steam powered vehicles.

References

Defunct motor vehicle manufacturers of the United States
1890s cars
1900s cars
Vehicle manufacturing companies established in 1899
American companies established in 1899